The Mitsubishi Astron or 4G5/4D5 engine, is a series of straight-four internal combustion engines first built by Mitsubishi Motors in 1972. Engine displacement ranged from 1.8 to 2.6 litres, making it one of the largest four-cylinder engines of its time.

Design
It employed a hemispherical cylinder head, chain-driven single overhead camshaft (SOHC) and eight valves (two per cylinder). United States passenger car versions had a small secondary intake valve referred to as the "Jet Valve". This valve induced swirl in the intake charge, enabling the use of leaner fuel/air mixtures for lower emissions. It was designed as a cartridge containing the valve spring and seat which simply screwed into a threaded hole in the head, similar to a spark plug but inside the cam cover. The rocker arms for the intake valve were widened on the valve end to accommodate the cartridge, which was equipped with a very soft valve spring in order to avoid wear on the camshaft intake lobe. Modifications to the head were thereby reduced as the Jet Valve negated the necessity for a three-valve-per-cylinder design.

In 1975, the Astron 80 introduced a system dubbed "Silent Shaft": the first use of twin balance shafts in a modern engine. It followed the designs of Frederick Lanchester, whose original patents Mitsubishi had obtained, and proved influential as Fiat/Lancia, Saab and Porsche all licensed this technology.

The 4D5 engine is a range of four-cylinder belt-driven overhead camshaft diesel engines which were part of the "Astron" family, and introduced in 1980 in the then new fifth generation Galant. As the first turbodiesel to be offered in a Japanese passenger car, it proved popular in the emerging SUV and minivan markets where Mitsubishi was highly successful, until superseded by the 4M4 range in 1993. However, production of the 4D5 (4D56) continued throughout the 1990s as a lower-cost option than the more modern powerplants. Until now it is still in production, but made into a modern powerplant by putting a common rail direct injection fuel system into the engine.

4G51 (1.85 liters)
The 4G51 displaces .

Applications:
 1977–1979 Chrysler Sigma (GE)

4G52 (2.0 liters)
The 4G52 displaces .

Used an  bore and stroke. In Australia this engine was used in the Sigma, Scorpion and L200.

 1975.01–19?? Mitsubishi Canter (third generation)
 1977–1981 Mitsubishi Lancer Celeste
 1973-1977– Mitsubishi Galant GTO (A57)
 1973-1987 Mitsubishi Galant
 1973–1987 Mitsubishi Sigma (GE, GH, GJ, GK, GN)
1979-1986 Mitsubishi L200/Dodge Ram 50 (L020)
 1974–1977 Dodge Colt
 1975–1978 Plymouth Arrow

4G53 (2.4 liters)
This engine shares its dimensions with the contemporary Fuso 4DR1 diesel engine.

Applications
 1975.01–19?? Mitsubishi Canter
 Mitsubishi Fuso Rosa (2nd generation)
 Mitsubishi Jeep
 Mitsubishi FG30 3-ton forklift;

4G54 (2.6 liters)
The G54B for the US market had a cylinder head with additional jet valves to improve emissions (MCA-Jet system). The engine was fitted to various Mitsubishi models from 1978 to 1997 and to the American Chrysler K-cars and their derivatives between 1981 and 1987. It was primarily set up longitudinally for use in rear-wheel drive and all-wheel drive platforms but also as a transverse engine in the front-wheel drive platform of the Mitsubishi Magna and Chrysler K platform. Chrysler commonly marketed the engine "Hemi," whereas the Australian-made version was marketed as the "Astron II" and featured "Balance Shaft" technology, which was subsequently licensed to Porsche and other automakers. The original engine featured a Mikuni two-barrel carburetor with a secondary vacuum actuator; later versions adopted EFI. Chrysler commonly paired this engine with its A470 3-speed automatic transmission; in Australia, Mitsubishi adapted it to a 5-speed manual transmission and its "ELC" (Electronic Control) 4-speed automatic transmission, featuring electronic overdrive. Chrysler eventually replaced the 4G54 with its own 2.5 L engine, whereas Mitsubishi replaced it with a 2.4 L engine codenamed 4G64.

Specifications:

ECI-Multi
Multi-point fuel injection

 at 4750 rpm (91 RON)
 at 4750 rpm (95 RON)
 at 3750 rpm (91 RON)
 at 4000 rpm (95 RON)
Compression ratio: 9.2:1

Carburetor
Single two-Venturi downdraught carburetor.  at 5000 rpm (91 RON),  at 3000 rpm (91 RON). Compression ratio: 8.8:1

 1978-1980 Plymouth Fire Arrow
 1978-1983 Dodge Challenger/Mitsubishi Sapporo/Plymouth Sapporo
 1978-1986 Mitsubishi Debonair
 1979-198? Mitsubishi Canter FC 35
 1979-1989 Dodge Ram 50
 1980-1987 Chrysler/Mitsubishi Sigma
 1981-1985 Dodge Aries/Plymouth Reliant
 1982-1985 Chrysler LeBaron
 1982-1985 Chrysler Town and Country
 1983-1986 Chrysler Executive
 1982-1991 Mitsubishi Pajero
 1982-1983 Dodge 400
 1982-1989 Mitsubishi Starion (turbocharger and Throttle-body fuel injection)
 1983-1984 Chrysler E-Class
 1983-1985 Chrysler New Yorker/Dodge 600
 1984-1987 Dodge Caravan/Plymouth Voyager
 1984-1986 Dodge Conquest/Plymouth Conquest (turbocharger and Throttle-body fuel injection)
 1985 Plymouth Caravelle
 1985-1996 Mitsubishi Magna (1985-1996 TM-TS series carburetor; 1987-1996 TP-TS series Multi-point fuel injection)
 1986-1989 Mazda B2600
 1987-1989 Chrysler Conquest (turbocharger and Throttle-body fuel injection)
 1987-1989 Dodge Raider
1987-1998 Jeep Sahra-Pars Khodro Iran
 1991-1997 Mitsubishi Pajero China market version

4G55 (2.3 liters)
The 4G55 displaces .

4D55 (2.3 liters diesel)
Displacement -  
Bore x Stroke -  
Fuel Type - Diesel 
Valves per cylinder - 2

Non-Turbo
 Power -  at 4200 rpm (JIS)
 at 4200 rpm (SAE)
 Torque -  at 2500 rpm (JIS)
 at 2000 rpm (SAE)
Engine type - Inline four-cylinder SOHC
 Compression ratio - 21.0:1
 Applications
 1980-1983 Mitsubishi Galant Σ/Eterna Σ
 1982-1986 Mitsubishi Pajero
 1982-1986 Mitsubishi Delica/L300
 Mitsubishi L200/Forte (first generation)
1985-1987 Ford Ranger (first generation)

Turbo (TC05 non-wastegated turbo)
 Power -  at 4000 rpm (SAE)
 Torque -  at 2000 rpm (SAE)
 Engine type - Inline 4-cylinder SOHC
 Compression ratio - 21.0:1
 Applications - 1980-1983

Turbo (TD04 wastegated turbo)
 Power -  at 4200 rpm (JIS)
 at 4200 rpm (DIN)
 at 4200 rpm (SAE)
 Torque -  at 2500 rpm (JIS)
 at 2500 rpm (DIN)
 at 2000 rpm (SAE)
 Engine type - Inline 4-cylinder SOHC
 Compression ratio - 21.0:1
 Applications:
 1980-1983 Mitsubishi Galant Σ/Eterna Σ
 1980-1984 Mitsubishi Galant Λ/Eterna Λ
 1982-1986 Mitsubishi Pajero
 1985-1987 Ford Ranger
 1983-1985 Dodge Ram 50

4D56 (2.5 liters diesel)

Displacement - 
Bore x Stroke - 
Fuel type - DIESEL

This engine is also built by Hyundai in South Korea, meaning it also sees use in some products made by their Kia subsidiary. Hyundai calls it the D4BH.

Non-Turbo
 Power -  at 4200 rpm
 Torque -  at 2500 rpm
 Engine type - Inline 4-cylinder SOHC
 Fuel system - Distribution type jet pump
 Compression ratio - 21.0:1

Non-intercooled Turbo
 Power -  at 4200 rpm
 Torque -  at 2000 rpm
 Engine type - Inline 4-cylinder SOHC

Intercooled Turbo (TD04 Turbo)
 Power -  at 4200 rpm
 Torque -  at 2000 rpm
 Engine type - Inline 4-cylinder SOHC
 Fuel system - Distribution type jet pump
 Compression ratio - 21.0:1

Intercooled Turbo (TD04 water-cooled Turbo)
 Power -   at 4300 rpm
 Torque -  at 2000 rpm
 Engine type - Inline 4-cylinder SOHC
 Rocker arm - Roller Follower type
 Fuel system - Distribution type jet pump (indirect injection)
 Combustion chamber - Swirl type
 Bore x Stroke - 
 Compression ratio - 21.0:1
 Lubrication System - Pressure feed, full flow filtration
 Intercooler Type - Aluminium Air-to-Air, Top-mounted
 Turbocharger - Mitsubishi TD04-09B

Also known as Hyundai D4BH

Intercooled Turbo TF035HL2 (1st Generation DI-D) 
 Power -   at 4000 rpm
 Torque -   at 2000 rpm
 Engine type - Inline 4-cylinder
 Fuel system - 1st Generation Common Rail Direct Injection (CRDi)
 Compression ratio - 17.0:1

Intercooled Turbo (2nd Generation DI-D)
 Power -  at 4000 rpm
 Torque -   at 2000 rpm.
 Engine type - Inline 4-cylinder DOHC 16 valve
 Fuel system - 2nd Generation Common Rail Direct Injection (CRDi)
 Compression ratio - 17.0:1
application: Mitsubishi Challenger, Mitsubishi Triton

Intercooled Turbo (3rd Generation DI-D with variable geometry turbo)
With manual transmission
 Power -  at 4000 rpm
 Torque -   at 2000 rpm
 Engine type - Inline 4-cylinder
 Fuel system - 2nd Generation Common Rail Direct Injection (CRDi)
 Compression ratio - 16.5:1
 Turbocharger - Variable Geometry (VG) technology
With automatic transmission
 Power -  at 4000 rpm
 Torque -   at 1800 rpm
 Engine type - Inline 4-cylinder
 Fuel system - 2nd Generation Common Rail Direct Injection (CRDi)
 Compression ratio -  16.5:1
 Turbocharger - Variable Geometry (VG) technology
application: Mitsubishi Challenger, Mitsubishi Triton

See also
 Mitsubishi Motors engines
 List of engines used in Chrysler products

References

Astron
Straight-four engines
Diesel engines by model
Gasoline engines by model